Rear Admiral Robert Witcher Copeland (September 9, 1910 – August 25, 1973) was a United States Navy officer who served during World War II.

Copeland was born in Tacoma, Washington. Enlisted in the Naval Reserve in 1929, he was commissioned as a Naval Reserve officer in 1935. Copeland practiced law from 1935 until 1940, when he was ordered to active duty during the Navy's pre-World War II expansion.

During the Battle off Samar, October 25, 1944, while commanding Samuel B. Roberts, Lieutenant Commander Copeland led his ship and crew in an attack on a superior Japanese battleship and cruiser force. Though his ship was lost, this action helped defeat the Japanese counter-offensive against the Leyte invasion. For this, he was awarded the Navy Cross, and shared the Presidential Unit Citation with the rest of Task Unit 77.4.3.

According to the action report of the USS Samuel B. Roberts, "The crew were informed over the loud speaker system at the beginning of the action, of the Commanding Officer's estimate of the situation, that is, a fight against overwhelming odds from which survival could not be expected, during which time we would do what damage we could. In the face of this knowledge the men zealously manned their stations wherever they might be, and fought and worked with such calmness, courage and efficiency that no higher honor could be conceived than to command such a group of men."

Following World War II, Copeland resumed his law career while remaining a member of the Naval Reserve, in which he rose to the rank of Rear Admiral. Robert W. Copeland died at Tacoma, Washington, on August 25, 1973. He was cremated and his ashes were scattered at sea.

In 1980, the frigate  was named for him.

Awards

Navy Cross citation

Lieutenant Commander Robert Witcher Copeland
U.S. Navy
Date Of Action: October 25, 1944
The President of the United States of America takes pleasure in presenting the Navy Cross to Lieutenant Commander Robert Witcher Copeland, United States Naval Reserve, for extraordinary heroism and distinguished service in the line of his profession as Commanding Officer of the Destroyer Escort U.S.S. SAMUEL B. ROBERTS (DE-413), in a surface action with a large task force of the Japanese Fleet off the Island of Samar, in Philippine waters, during the Battle of Leyte Gulf on 25 October 1944. Against an enemy force vastly superior in numbers, armament and armor, with cool deliberation Lieutenant Commander Copeland closed to within 4,000 yards of a heavy cruiser to deliver a torpedo attack on the rapidly advancing enemy who had taken him under fire from their large caliber guns. By his heroic action, he thus diverted enemy fire to himself from the almost defenseless vessels which he was protecting. Although his ship was lost in this engagement, his heroic actions were instrumental in turning back, sorely crippled, a vastly superior enemy force. His extraordinary courage and magnificent fighting spirit in the face of terrific odds will live forever in the memory of the officers and men who served with him that day. His conduct was in keeping with the highest traditions of the Navy of the United States.

Notes

Further information

Books

 
 
 
 

1910 births
1973 deaths
United States Navy rear admirals
Washington (state) lawyers
United States Navy personnel of World War II
Recipients of the Navy Cross (United States)
Military personnel from Tacoma, Washington
20th-century American lawyers
United States Navy reservists
Burials at sea